Phragmataecia albida is a species of moth of the family Cossidae. It is found in Greece, Iran, Turkmenistan, Uzbekistan, Kazakhstan, north-western China (Kuldja), Afghanistan and south-western Russia (the southern Volga region).

The wingspan is 36–44 mm.

References

Moths described in 1874
Phragmataecia
Moths of Europe
Moths of Asia